Sheana Keane (born 27 May 1975) is an Irish presenter on Raidió Teilifís Éireann (RTÉ). She presented the programmes Health Squad (2001–2006) and The Afternoon Show (2004–2005; 2006–2010).

Her broadcasting career began as a researcher on Wanderlust (RTÉ's Internet-based blind date programme) in 2001 and as a researcher and broadcaster on the daytime talk show Open House in 2002.

One of RTÉ's new generation of "rising stars", Keane's interviewing skills stem from her commercial background as a Change Management Consultant.

Personal Life

She was educated at University College Dublin and holds a master's degree in psychology. She is married to Jonathan Forrest, managing director of Cybercom, and they have two children.

2014–Present TV3

In 2014, after almost four years since presenting The Afternoon Show on RTÉ One, Keane reportedly is set to begin presenting Late Lunch Live on TV3 in a bid to improve ratings by bosses. It is unclear whether this will be temporary or permanent.

References
 

1975 births
Living people
Alumni of University College Dublin
RTÉ television presenters